The 2018–19 EuroCup Basketball Playoffs began on 5 March and will end on 12 or 15 April 2019 with the second or third leg, if necessary, of the 2019 EuroCup Finals, to decide the champions of the 2018–19 EuroCup Basketball. Eight teams compete in the playoffs.

Times up to 27 March 2019 are CET (UTC+1), thereafter (finals) times are CEST (UTC+2).

Format
The playoffs involves the eight teams which qualified as winners and runners-up of each of the four groups in the 2018–19 EuroCup Basketball Top 16.

Each tie in the playoffs, apart from the final, is played with a best-of-three-games format. The team that performed better in the Top 16 will play the games first and third, if necessary, at home.

Qualified teams

Standings

Bracket

Quarterfinals
The first legs were played on 5 March, the second legs on 8 March and the third legs, if necessary, on 13 March 2019.

|}

First leg

Second leg

Third leg

Semifinals
The first legs were played on 19 March, the second legs on 22 March.

|}

First leg

Second leg

Finals

The first leg will be played on 9 April, the second leg on 12 April, and the third leg on 15 April 2019, if necessary.

|}

First leg

Second leg

Third leg

References

External links
EuroCup Basketball (official website)

2018–19 EuroCup Basketball